Bazarsar-e Lafmejan (also Romanized as Bāzārsar-e Lafmejān) is a village in Lafmejan Rural District, in the Central District of Lahijan County, Gilan Province, Iran. At the 2006 census, its population was 382, in 130 families.

References 

Populated places in Lahijan County